The 1897–98 Yale Bulldogs men's ice hockey season was the 3rd season of play for the program.

Season
For the first time the Elis played a majority of their games against fellow college programs as well as play most of their games at home.

The team did not have a coach, however, M. Mullally served as team manager.

Roster

Standings

Schedule and Results

|-
!colspan=12 style="color:white; background:#00356B" | Regular Season

References

Yale Bulldogs men's ice hockey seasons
Yale
Yale
Yale
Yale